GLUT8 also known as SLC2A8 is the eighth member of glucose transporter superfamily.

It is characterized by the presence of  two leucine residues in its N-terminal intracellular domain, which influences intracellular trafficking.

Discovery 

GLUT8, originally named GLUTX1, was cloned almost simultaneously by two different groups.

Tissue distribution

Subcellular localization 

Contrary to GLUT4, GLUT8 (previously known as GLUTX1) is not insulin-sensitive. In other words, insulin does not promote GLUT8 translocation to the cell surface in neurons as well as in transfected cell lines.

Where in the cell GLUT8 is localized in not yet clear. Most GLUT8 is not present at the cell surface. Some co-localization with both the endoplasmic reticulum and late endosomes/lysosomes has been published.

When the N-terminal di-leucine motif is mutated into a di-alanine motif, GLUT8 is located mostly at the cell surface in Xenopus oocytes and mammalian cells such as HEK 293 cells and differentiated PC12 cells.

Physiological role 

GLUT8 function in vivo remains to be defined, despite suggestions that it may play a role in fertility, being expressed at high levels in testes and in the acrosomal part of spermatozoa. Furthermore, GLUT8 appears to play an important role in the energy metabolism of sperm cells.

GLUT8, when expressed in Xenopus oocytes, mediates glucose uptake with high affinity. Other hexoses are not good substrates of the transporter.

Mice devoid of both copies of the SLC2A8 gene are viable, fertile and do not show any obvious phenotype. They are not diabetic, showing that GLUT8 is unlikely to play major roles in glucose homeostasis.

References

Membrane proteins
Solute carrier family